Darren Powell is an English football coach. He is originally from Nottingham, England.

Career
On 30 October 2019, it was announced that Powell and San Antonio FC had mutually parted ways.

On 16 March 2021, Powell was named head coach of Fort Lauderdale CF in USL League One.

References

External links
Meet Darren Powell

1995 births
Living people
San Antonio FC coaches
English football managers
UNC Greensboro Spartans men's soccer coaches
Elon Phoenix men's soccer coaches
Orlando City SC non-playing staff
Inter Miami CF non-playing staff
College men's soccer coaches in the United States
Greensboro Pride
USL League One coaches
USL Championship coaches
Association football coaches
English expatriate football managers
English expatriate sportspeople in the United States
Expatriate soccer managers in the United States
Sportspeople from Nottingham